William Berkeley, 4th Baron Berkeley of Stratton PC, PC (I) (d. 24 March 1741), was a British politician and judge, of the Bruton branch of the Berkeley family. He was Master of the Rolls in Ireland between 1696 and 1731 and also held political office as Chancellor of the Duchy of Lancaster from 1710 to 1714 and as First Lord of Trade from 1714 to 1715.

Background
Berkeley was the third son of John Berkeley, 1st Baron Berkeley of Stratton, by Christiana, daughter of Sir Andrew Riccard. Charles, who held the title for two years, and John, an Admiral who held the title for 16 years were his elder brothers. He lived a much longer life. He was born on an unknown date between John's 1663 birth and 23 March 1672, all dates which would make him a septuagenarian per his funerary monument.

Political and judicial career
In 1696 Berkeley was appointed Master of the Rolls in Ireland and sworn of the Irish Privy Council. The following year he succeeded his elder brother in the barony. In 1710 he was admitted to the English Privy Council and appointed Chancellor of the Duchy of Lancaster. He was made First Lord of Trade in 1714, a post he held until 1715. He remained Master of the Rolls in Ireland during this period and continued in this post until 1731.

Family
Lord Berkeley of Stratton married Frances, daughter of Sir John Temple and Jane Yarner; her sister Jane married his elder brother. They had several children, including the Honourable Frances, who married William Byron, 4th Baron Byron, and was the mother of William Byron, 5th Baron Byron, and of Admiral John Byron. Lady Berkeley of Stratton died in July 1707. Lord Berkeley of Stratton remained a widower until his death at Bruton, Somerset, in March 1741. He was succeeded by his eldest son, John.

Notes and references
Notes

References

17th-century births
1741 deaths
17th-century English politicians
18th-century British politicians
17th-century Irish judges
18th-century Irish judges
Members of the Privy Council of Great Britain
Members of the Privy Council of Ireland
William
Year of birth unknown
Masters of the Rolls in Ireland
Presidents of the Board of Trade
Chancellors of the Duchy of Lancaster
4